Shane Mekeland (born 1969/1970) is an American politician serving in the Minnesota House of Representatives since 2019. A member of the Republican Party of Minnesota, Mekeland represents District 15B in central Minnesota, which includes the city of Big Lake and parts of Sherburne County.

Early life and career
Mekeland was a convenience store manager and owner for 20 years. He is a general contractor.

Minnesota House of Representatives
Mekeland was elected to the Minnesota House of Representatives in 2018, succeeding Jim Newberger, who retired to run in the 2018 U.S. Senate election, and has been reelected every two years since. He serves on the Climate and Energy Finance and Policy and Labor and Industry Finance and Policy Committees.

Personal life
Mekeland has one child and resides in Clear Lake, Minnesota.

References

External links

 Official House of Representatives website
 Official campaign website

Living people
Republican Party members of the Minnesota House of Representatives
21st-century American politicians
Year of birth uncertain
Year of birth missing (living people)